St. Michael's Churchyard may refer to:

St. Michael's Churchyard, Charleston, an Anglican parish church in Charleston, South Carolina
St. Michael's Churchyard, Mickleham, a church and cemetery in Surrey, England

See also
St. Michael's Cemetery (disambiguation)